Dirbaz is a Persian surname. Notable people with the surname include:

Asghar Dirbaz (born 1959), Iranian Shiite cleric, author, and politician
Kambiz Dirbaz (born 1975), Iranian actor

Persian-language surnames